Dorstenia urceolata is a plant species  in the family Moraceae which is native to eastern Brazil.

References

urceolata
Plants described in 1821
Flora of Brazil